The Eugenia (or Ocean Tramp Tankers Corp v V/O Sovfracht) [1964] 2 QB 226 is an English contract law case, concerning the frustration of an agreement.

Facts
The Suez canal became a "dangerous zone" as The Eugenia, carrying iron and steel, sailed towards it on the way to India from Odessa (but starting in Genoa). The charterers, in breach of a "general war clause" in the contract saying dangerous zones should be avoided, sailed into Port Said, thinking they could make it through the canal in time. The alternative was to sail around the Cape of Good Hope, which would have taken a long time. The ship was impounded as the canal was closed. The charterers then abandoned the contract and claimed it was frustrated. The claimant owners of the iron and steel claimed it was breach of contract.

Judgment
Lord Denning MR held that there was no frustration of the contract. First, that the charterers could not rely on any self-induced frustration (sailing into the canal) as a ground for arguing the contract was frustrated. If they had not tried the Suez canal, they would have had to sail around the Cape, but this would not have rendered the contract radically different.

He said if the contract says something, "the contract must govern. There is no frustration." But if the contract says nothing, onerous or more expensive is not enough; "It must be positively unjust to hold the parties bound. It is often difficult to draw the line. But it must be done, and it is the courts to do it as a matter of law: see Tsakiroglou." He said that the material factors were that the difference in time was 108 days from Genoa via the Suez and 138 days via the Cape. The goods would not be adversely affected. The only trouble was it took longer. He firmly rejected, however, that frustration can only apply where the event is unforeseen or unexpected.

See also
English contract law
Frustration in English law

Notes

References

Lord Denning cases
Court of Appeal (England and Wales) cases
1964 in case law
1964 in British law
English frustration case law